The Greehey Children's Cancer Research Institute is a research center in San Antonio, Texas, US.

The institute was established in 1999 under a $200,000,000 endowment from the State of Texas tobacco settlement, at the time the largest single oncology endowment in US history. The $50 million facility was completed in 2004. The facility is part of the University of Texas Health Science Center at San Antonio.

See also
 South Texas Medical Center

References

University of Texas System
South Texas Medical Center
University of Texas Health Science Center at San Antonio
Cancer research